was an officer and ace fighter pilot in the Imperial Japanese Navy (IJN) during the Second Sino-Japanese War and the Pacific theater of World War II. In aerial combat over China and the Pacific, he was officially credited with destroying seven enemy aircraft. Kudō was killed in action while participating in an air attack on Broome, Australia on 3 March 1942. He was shot down by ML-KNIL Lieutenant Gus Winckel, who had dismounted the 7.99mm machine gun from his Lockheed Lodestar and balanced it on his shoulder while firing.

References

1915 births
1942 deaths
Japanese naval aviators
Japanese World War II flying aces
Military personnel from Ōita Prefecture
Japanese military personnel killed in World War II
Imperial Japanese Navy officers
Aviators killed by being shot down